Cino da Pistoia (1270 – 1336/37) was an Italian jurist and poet.

He was born in Pistoia, Tuscany. His full name was Guittoncino dei Sinibaldi or, Latinised, Cinus de Sighibuldis. His father was a noble man from the House of Sinibaldi. He received his doctorate from the University of Bologna, where he studied under Dinus de Rossonis, and taught law at the universities of Siena, Florence, Perugia, and Naples. In 1334, he was elected Gonfaloniere of Pistoia, but did not take up the office.

Cino's most important legal work was Lectura in codicem (1312–1314), a commentary on the Justinian Code which blended pure Roman law with contemporary statutes and customary and canon law, thereby initiating Italian common law. He wrote some 200 lyric poems notable for purity of language and harmony of rhythms, most of them dedicated to a woman named . Dante, a friend of his, in De vulgari eloquentia, praised his poetry.

Cino was also close to his fellow student Giovanni d'Andrea and was a literary friend of Petrarch. Two of his students were Bartolus (in Perugia) and Francesco Petrarca (in Bologna).

He is the narrator of Ezra Pound's dramatic monologue "Cino."

Works

References

Sources

External links
  http://www.unisi.it/docentes/siena/docenti/sinibuldi.html
Complete works and editions by Cino da Pistoia at ParalipomenaIuris

1270 births
1336 deaths
People from Pistoia
Italian poets
Italian male poets
14th-century Italian jurists
Italian Renaissance humanists
University of Bologna alumni
Academic staff of the University of Perugia
Academic staff of the University of Florence
Academic staff of the University of Siena
14th-century Italian poets
14th-century Latin writers